Ezerovo (Bulgarian: Езерово) is a village in Beloslav Municipality, Varna Province, north-eastern Bulgaria.

As of September 2015 the village has a population of 1843.

References

Villages in Varna Province